Siege of Domfront may refer to:

Siege of Domfront (1052), the siege and capture of the town by Geoffrey II, Count of Anjou
Siege of Domfront (1053), the siege and recapture of the town by William, Duke of Normandy
Siege of Domfront (1356), the siege and capture of the town by the French during the Hundred Years' War
Siege of Domfront (1418), the siege and capture of the town by the English during the Hundred Years' War
Siege of Domfront (1450), the siege and capture of the town by the French during the Hundred Years' War
Siege of Domfront (1574), the siege and capture of the town